See also List of people who have lived in airports

Sanjay Shah is a Dubai-based British-Indian businessman and suspected tax fraudster. He founded Solo Capital, a hedge fund firm which closed in 2016, and the NGO Autism Rocks, which closed in 2020.

Shah is a prime suspect in a case regarding the Danish Government being allegedly defrauded of 12.7 billion DKK for (1.65 billion euros) between 2012 and 2015, part of the CumEx-Files involving multiple European nations and involves a number of the world's largest banks such as Barclays, Merrill Lynch, JP Morgan, Morgan Stanley, BNP Paribas, Banco Santander, Macquarie Bank and Deutsche Bank. Shah has admitted his company enabled clients to claim around DKK 8 billion from the Ministry of Taxation. He claimed that he was only using legal tax loopholes, where dividend income is taxed differently in various jurisdictions.

Career
Shah worked as a banker for Morgan Stanley, Credit Suisse and Rabobank "over a period of almost 20 years and – after finding himself unemployed in 2008 – set up his own investment management, brokerage and principal trading business". He founded the hedge fund firm Solo Capital in London, which employed "more than 100 financial experts across offices in London and Dubai". Shah was investigated in regards to tax fraud and Solo Capital closed in 2016, amid the investigation by Danish authorities, while his London home and offices were raided by the British National Crime Agency, and Varengold Bank (co-owned by Shah) was raided by German authorities.

Danish dividend tax fraud charges
In 2010, in an audit report, the Danish Ministry of Taxation was found to have ignored warnings on multiple occasions of a legal tax loophole concerning dividend tax. This was two years before Sanjay Shah's company Solo Capital enabled clients to be paid more than 8 billions of DKK in tax refunds. In June 2018, Denmark's Ministry of Taxation filed a civil claim in the UK High Court of Justice, claiming it had been the victim of fraud, conspiracy, dishonesty and unjust enrichment.

Since 2015, Shah has been the prime suspect in a case regarding the Danish Government being allegedly defrauded of 12.7 billion DKK (1.65 billion euros) which was exposed in the CumEx-Files. Shah was investigated in regards to the case in 2015. The alleged tax fraud took place between 2012 and 2015 and is the largest in the history of Denmark. Shah is also the prime suspect in similar alleged tax fraud cases involving more than 200 million euros in Belgium and 65,000 euros (580,000 NOK) in Norway respectively. An additional 300 million euros in Belgium and 40 million euros (350 million NOK) in Norway were only stopped, because of warnings from the Danish authorities. In addition, he is being investigated since 2016 by Germany and the UK via Eurojust, and by the US Treasury Department, as it is suspected that some of the money were funneled through US pension funds.

As of December 2016, about 300 million euros had been seized by the Danish police in cooperation with foreign police forces.

In 2017, two suspected co-conspirators were also charged by the Danish authorities.

In September 2018, a High Court of Justice judge in London entered a $1.3 billion default judgment against two UK companies, Solo Capital Limited and Elysium Global (UK) Limited, which were no longer in Shah's control, at the behest of the Danish tax agency SKAT. The claims against these companies were not defended, hence the default judgment. In the same month, finans.dk, a subsidiary of the Jyllands-Posten newspaper, reported that assets in Elysium Global and Elysium Properties, two of Shah's companies, had been frozen. and that Danish authorities have filed cases against him in the Dubai International Financial Centre Courts as well as the Commercial Court in London.

In 2018, Britain, Germany and the United Arab Emirates had frozen, but not confiscated $660 million in assets belonging to Shah.

In May 2019, a number of American pension funds agreed to return 1.6 billion DKK (239 million USD) in a related tax-fraud case. In September 2019, German North Channel Bank accepted a fine of 110 million DKK for its involvement in a related tax fraud scheme. Shah remains the main suspect in the main tax fraud case.

In September 2019, Danish tax authorities reported that a ruling in Dubai against a 'central player' in the tax fraud case provides access to 9 million documents, of which 3.5 million had already been transferred. Shah's spokesman, Jack Irvine, has confirmed that these documents came from Shah. As of September 2019, the total number of Danish indictments against persons and companies involved in the tax fraud scheme has risen to 476 with projected legal costs of 2.4 billion Danish kroner. In May 2020, the Tax Minister Morten Bødskov announced that the fees paid to lawyers was USD350 million, and that 250 new employees had been added to the Tax Office to address massive failures in control.

In September 2019, the authorities have so far found no evidence of fraud in the UK, Germany or Denmark.

In November 2019, British and Danish authorities reached an agreement that the main prosecution against Shah should take place in a Danish court of law, and both countries support his extradition from Dubai to Denmark.

Extradition of a suspect from the United Arab Emirates has been described by a Danish expert as 'almost impossible' due to reciprocity as UAE implements death sentence for certain crimes and Denmark can't do this due to human rights concerns.

As of 2019, Shah has denied any wrongdoing. In papers lodged in London's High Court as part of a civil case brought by the Danish tax authority SKAT, Shah's lawyers rejected the allegations against him.

The Danish Prosecutor interrogated Shah in Abu Dhabi over three days in a voluntary interview in September 2019.

On 12 August 2020, the Dubai Court dismissed the Danish government's claim that it had been defrauded by Sanjay Shah of £1.5 billion (Dh7.2 bn), due to lack of evidence.

In January 2021, Danish prosecutors charged Shah with fraudulently reclaiming $1.6 billion in dividend tax. Prosecutors are seeking a 12 year sentence due to the severity of case. In April 2021, the United Kingdom Commercial Court dismissed Denmark's claim against Shah, with judge Andrew Baker stating that the charges were "politically as well as financially motivated"; however, the court did not take action on Shah's frozen assets in Great Britain at that time.
On 28 february 2022 the Danish government won the appeal case reversing High Courts previous dismissal of the case, with judge Julian Flaux stating that "judge [Baker] fell into error in accepting" the alleged fraud defendants' submission.

On 31 May 2022 Shah was arrested in Dubai to face trial for potential extradition to Denmark. On 12 September 2022 the judge of the case ruled that Shah wouldn't be extradited to Denmark, due to a lack of documents regarding the investigation. The Danish authorities have the ability to appeal the decision.

On 15 September 2022, a Dubai civil court reportedly ruled that Sanjay Shah and other suspects in the Danish dividend tax fraud case return around 8 billion DKK ($1.1 billion) to Denmark.

Personal life
Shah is married and has 3 children. In 2009, he moved to Dubai "after falling in love with the city". His youngest son, Nikhil, was diagnosed with autism in 2011. After working with therapists and medical experts for 3 years, he decided to raise awareness about autism and in 2014 founded Autism Rocks in 2014.

See also
CumEx-Files

References

External links

21st-century English businesspeople
People educated at the City of London School
English expatriates in the United Arab Emirates
English financial businesspeople
English people of Indian descent
Founders of charities
Living people
Businesspeople from London
Year of birth missing (living people)